The Drum Tower of Beijing, or Gulou, is situated at the northern end of the central axis of the Inner City to the north of Di'anmen Street.  Originally built for musical reasons, it was later used to announce the time and is now a tourist attraction.

The Bell Tower of Beijing, stands closely behind the drum tower. Together, the Bell Tower and Drum Tower have panoramic views over central Beijing. Before the modern era, both towers dominated the Beijing skyline.

Function
Bells and drums were musical instruments in ancient China. Later, they were used by government and communities to announce the time. The Bell and Drum Towers were central to official timekeeping in China in the Yuan, Ming, and Qing dynasties.

The Bell and Drum Towers continued to function as the official timepiece of Beijing until 1924. That year, the Beijing Coup led to the expulsion of Puyi, the last emperor of the Qing Dynasty, from the Forbidden City, and the adoption of Western-style clocks for official time-keeping.

History
The Drum Tower was built in 1272 during the Yuan dynasty. At that time the city was called Khanbaliq and the tower was named the Tower of Orderly Administration. In 1420, during the reign of the Yongle Emperor, the building was rebuilt to the east of its original site. The Qing dynasty carried out important renovations in 1800. Following the Beijing Coup in 1924, Feng Yuxiang removed the official status of the towers, replacing them with Western time-keeping methods, and renamed the building as the Tower of Clarifying Shame. Objects related to the Eight-Nation Alliance's invasion of Beijing and later the May 30 Massacre of 1925 were put on display, turning the towers into a museum. The upper story of the Drum Tower currently serves as the People's Cultural Hall of the East City District.

In the 1980s, after much repair work, the Bell and Drum Towers were opened to tourists.

Architecture
The Drum Tower is a -tall two-story building made of wood. The upper story of the building housed 24 drums, of which only one survives. New drums have been made to replace them. Nearby stands the Bell Tower, a -tall edifice with gray walls and a green glazed roof.

See also

Imperial City, Beijing
2008 Beijing Drum Tower stabbings

References

External links

 Chinaguide.com: The Beijing Drum Tower — 360-degree virtual tour and photographs.
 Kinabaloo.com: The Drum and Bell Towers in Beijing — 30 high quality photographs.

Buildings and structures in Beijing
Towers in China
Dongcheng District, Beijing
Major National Historical and Cultural Sites in Beijing
Museums in Beijing
Tourist attractions in Beijing
Yuan dynasty architecture
Ming dynasty architecture
Articles containing video clips
China
Drum towers